Cerodrillia girardi is a species of sea snail, a marine gastropod mollusk in the family Drilliidae.

Description
The size of an adult shell varies between 9 mm and 13 mm.

Distribution
This species occurs in the Atlantic Ocean from South Carolina to Florida, and in the Gulf of Mexico at depths between 49 m and 73 m.

References

 Lyons, William G. "New Turridae (Gastropoda: Toxoglossa) from south Florida and the eastern Gulf of Mexico." The Nautilus 86.1 (1972): 3–7.
 Rosenberg, G., F. Moretzsohn, and E. F. García. 2009. Gastropoda (Mollusca) of the Gulf of Mexico, Pp. 579–699 in Felder, D.L. and D.K. Camp (eds.), Gulf of Mexico–Origins, Waters, and Biota. Biodiversity. Texas A&M Press, College Station, Texas
 Fallon P.J. (2016). Taxonomic review of tropical western Atlantic shallow water Drilliidae (Mollusca: Gastropoda: Conoidea) including descriptions of 100 new species. Zootaxa. 4090(1): 1–363

External links
 

girardi
Gastropods described in 1972